Aitor Ariño Bengoechea (born 5 October 1992) is a Welsh-born Spanish handball player for FC Barcelona and the Spanish national team.

He participated at the 2018 European Men's Handball Championship.

References

External links

1992 births
Living people
Sportspeople from Penarth
Spanish male handball players
Liga ASOBAL players
FC Barcelona Handbol players
Mediterranean Games bronze medalists for Spain
Mediterranean Games medalists in handball
Competitors at the 2018 Mediterranean Games